Sophia Chew Nicklin Dallas (June 24, 1798 – January 11, 1869) was the wife of Vice President George Mifflin Dallas, and thus second lady of the United States from 1845 to 1849. She was the daughter of Philadelphia merchant Philip Nicklin and Julianna Nicklin (née Chew), and the granddaughter of Benjamin Chew.

George and Sophia Dallas wed in 1816 and had eight children. Dallas held a disliking for  Washington, D.C., and during her husband's term as vice president she remained mostly in Philadelphia except for occasional visits to the capital.

References

|-

1798 births
1869 deaths
Chew family
People from Philadelphia
American people of English descent
Second ladies of the United States
Spouses of Pennsylvania politicians